Head First is a series of introductory instructional books to many topics, published by O'Reilly Media. It stresses an unorthodox, visually intensive, reader-involving combination of puzzles, jokes, nonstandard design and layout, and an engaging, conversational style to immerse the reader in a given topic.

Originally, the series covered programming and software engineering, but is now expanding to other topics in science, mathematics and business, due to success. The series was created by Bert Bates and Kathy Sierra, and began with Head First Java in 2003.

Concept 
The main idea of the series is to effectively stimulate the brain by:

 Telling stories
 Visualizing
 Using attention-grabbing tactics: page layout, non-standard examples, puzzles, jokes, and other means.

By using metacognition the series' authors and editors try to employ varied methods to present information and accelerate the learning process.

Books 
The offerings in the Head First series are quickly expanding. The books are also delving into subjects that are not directly related to IT, such as Math (Head First Algebra, Head First Statistics), Science (Head First Physics) and project management (Head First PMP).  The books are also gaining some popularity for classroom use  because of their novel approach to their subject matters.

The official web site for the Head First series has forums for each book as well as code downloads and sample chapters. They include:

 Head First Agile by Andrew Stellman and Jennifer Greene
 Head First Ajax by Rebecca Riordan
 Head First Algebra by Dan Pilone and Tracey Pilone
 Head First Android Development by Dawn Griffiths and David Griffiths
 Head First C by David Griffiths and Dawn Griffiths
 Head First C# by Andrew Stellman and Jennifer Greene
 Head First Data Analysis by Michael Milton
 Head First Design Patterns by Eric Freeman, Elisabeth Freeman, Kathy Sierra and Bert Bates
 Head First EJB by Kathy Sierra and Bert Bates
 Head First Excel by Michael Milton
 Head First 2D Geometry by Lindsey Fallow and Dawn Griffiths
 Head First Git by Raju Gandhi
 Head First Go by Jay McGavren
 Head First HTML with CSS & XHTML by Elisabeth Freeman and Eric Freeman
 Head First HTML5 Programming by Eric Freeman and Elisabeth Robson
 Head First iPhone Development by Dan Pilone and Tracey Pilone
 Head First iPhone and iPad Development by Dan Pilone and Tracey Pilone
 Head First Java by Kathy Sierra and Bert Bates
 Head First JavaScript by Michael Morrison (Out of Print)
 Head First JavaScript Programming by Eric Freeman, Elisabeth Freeman
 Head First jQuery by Ryan Benedetti and Ronan Cranley
 Head First Kotlin by Dawn Griffiths and David Griffiths 
 Head First Learn to Code by Eric Freeman
 Head First Mobile Web by Lyza Danger Gardner, Jason Grigsby
 Head First Networking by Ryan Benedetti, Al Anderson
 Head First Object-Oriented Analysis and Design by Brett McLaughlin, Gary Pollice and David West
 Head First PHP & MySQL by Lynn Beighley and Michael Morrison
 Head First Physics by Heather Lang
 Head First PMP by Jennifer Greene and Andrew Stellman
 Head First Programming by Paul Barry and David Griffiths
 Head First Python by Paul Barry
 Head First Rails by David Griffiths
 Head First Servlets & JSP by Bryan Basham, Kathy Sierra and Bert Bates
 Head First Software Development by Dan Pilone and Russ Miles
 Head First SQL  by Lynn Beighley
 Head First Statistics by Dawn Griffiths
 Head First Web Design by Ethan Watrall and Jeff Siarto
 Head First WordPress by Jeff Siarto

Head First Labs 
O'Reilly established Head First Labs, where books of the series are presented and the main idea behind the series is explained.  The Labs also hosts blogs by some of their authors and hosts some applets that complement their books.

Awards 
The books in the series have received three nominations for Product Excellence Jolt Awards, winning in 2005 for Head First Design Patterns, and were recognized on Amazon.com's yearly top 10 list for computer books from 2003 to 2005.

References

External links
 

Computer books
O'Reilly Media books
Java (programming language)
Series of books